Sir John Henry Puleston (2 June 1830 – 19 October 1908) was a Welsh journalist and entrepreneur in the United States and later a Conservative politician who represented Devonport.

Biography
Puleston was born at Plasnewydd the son of John Puleston, a prosperous farmer of Llanfair Dyffryn Clwyd, and his wife Mary Jones. He was educated at  Ruthin Grammar School and King's College London. He went to America where he began by trying to establish a medical practice in New York. This was unsuccessful but he became acquainted with Governor Morgan and became involved in politics. He applied to Horace Greeley to become a political missionary for the Republican Party among Welsh miners in Pennsylvania. Turning to journalism, he edited a Welsh newspaper at Scranton, and purchased the Pittston Gazette. He was then editor of the Phoenixville Guardian for a short time, but departed from the town leaving debts. He invested in railroads and developed his political contacts. Puleston managed to obtain the role of secretary to a Peace Commission established prior to the American Civil War and achieved a national reputation, presenting reports to Abraham Lincoln and the House of Representatives. When the American Civil War broke out, Governor Curtin appointed Puleston as military agent for the state of Pennsylvania with the rank of Colonel. He later drew a lucrative salary as secretary of Butterfield's Overland Express Company, and then became a broker on Wall Street with the firm Raymond, Puleston & Co.  He was associated with Jay Cooke, McCullogh & Co, bankers and returned to London.

In 1874 Puleston was elected as one of the MPs for Plymouth Devonport. In 1879 as MP visiting  Philadelphia he was reminded of his debts, and hunted them down and repaid them all. He was chairman City of London Conservative Association and Treaurer of the Royal Asylum of St Anne's Society. He was awarded a knighthood in 1887.

Puleston died a bankrupt.

Family
Pulestone married, in 1857, the daughter of Rev. Edward Loyd, Llanfyllin, Montgomeryshire. Lady Puleston took a keen interest in her husband's constituency at Devonport. She died, at Whitehall Court, 19 January 1902.

References

External links 
 
 

1830 births
1908 deaths
Alumni of King's College London
Conservative Party (UK) MPs for English constituencies
UK MPs 1874–1880
UK MPs 1880–1885
UK MPs 1885–1886
UK MPs 1886–1892
19th-century American newspaper editors
19th-century American newspaper publishers (people)
People of Pennsylvania in the American Civil War
People educated at Ruthin School
Members of the Parliament of the United Kingdom for constituencies in Devon
Politicians from Denbighshire
Politicians from Plymouth, Devon